Marion Amy Snider (born 26 May 1942) is a Canadian hurdler. She competed in the women's 80 metres hurdles at the 1964 Summer Olympics.

References

1942 births
Living people
Athletes (track and field) at the 1964 Summer Olympics
Canadian female hurdlers
Olympic track and field athletes of Canada
Athletes from Toronto